Oleg Georgiyevich Fedoseyev (4 June 1936 – 14 June 2001) was a Russian athlete. He was a Soviet champion in the long jump in 1956 and 1958, but finished only eighth at the 1956 Olympics and 1958 European Championships. Fedoseyev then changed to triple jump and in 1959 won a Soviet title and set a world record in this event at 16.70 m. He later won a bronze medal at the 1962 European Championships and a silver at the 1964 Olympics. He also competed in sprint at the national level and in 1962 won a Soviet title in the 4 × 100 m relay.

References

1936 births
2001 deaths
Soviet male triple jumpers
Olympic silver medalists for the Soviet Union
Athletes (track and field) at the 1964 Summer Olympics
Olympic athletes of the Soviet Union
Burevestnik (sports society) athletes
Armed Forces sports society athletes
World record setters in athletics (track and field)
Athletes from Moscow
European Athletics Championships medalists
Athletes (track and field) at the 1956 Summer Olympics
Medalists at the 1964 Summer Olympics
Olympic silver medalists in athletics (track and field)